Lieutenant (later Lieutenant Colonel) Hilbert Leigh Bair began his service career as a World War I flying ace credited with six aerial victories.

Bair joined the U.S. Army Air Service on 18 July 1917. He was forwarded to the Royal Air Force for seasoning, and was assigned to 24 Squadron on 5 July 1918. On 22 August, he shared his first win with fellow ace William Lambert and a couple of other pilots, driving a Fokker D.VII down out of control. Bair also shared one of his two 29 August victories with another pilot. The next day, Bair and Horace Barton cooperated in the destruction of an Albatros reconnaissance plane. Bair singlehandedly destroyed a Fokker D.VII on 8 September. A week later, for his last triumph, he again teamed with Barton in the destruction of a Hannover recon plane. In October, Bair transferred back to an American unit, the 25th Aero Squadron.

In World War II, Hilbert Bair returned to service in the U.S. Army Air Force as a lieutenant colonel.

See also

 List of World War I flying aces from the United States
 25th Aero Squadron
 Reed G. Landis
 Frederick Ernest Luff
 Eugene Hoy Barksdale

References

Bibliography
Above the Trenches: a Complete Record of the Fighter Aces and Units of the British Empire Air Forces 1915-1920. Christopher F. Shores, Norman L. R. Franks, Russell Guest. Grub Street, 1990. , .

1894 births
1985 deaths
Recipients of the Distinguished Service Cross (United States)
American World War I flying aces
Burials in the National Memorial Cemetery of the Pacific